Patti is the seventh studio album released by American singer Patti LaBelle. It was released by Philadelphia International Records on July 3, 1985 in the United States.

Background
After seven years of modest success, Patti LaBelle finally became a mainstream solo star following the late 1983 release of the album, I'm in Love Again, and its hit singles, "If Only You Knew" and "Love, Need and Want You" and the 1984 soundtrack singles "New Attitude" and "Stir It Up", the latter two were featured on the soundtrack to the Eddie Murphy film, Beverly Hills Cop, and launched LaBelle into pop stardom. By July of the year, LaBelle received new notoriety by being a standout performer on that month's Live Aid concert in her hometown of Philadelphia. In December 1984, LaBelle signed a new contract with MCA Records and began work on her first MCA album, Winner in You. In the interim, Philadelphia International was left with a bunch of leftover LaBelle recordings culled from 1983-1984 recording sessions, including a live cover of "If You Don't Know Me By Now" by Harold Melvin & The Blue Notes.

The album included "Look to the Rainbow", which became the name of her live concert video culled from a 1985 show in New York, and the aforementioned cover of "If You Don't Know Me By Now", which, along with the R&B ballad "I Can't Forget You", hit the R&B charts. "If You Don't Know Me By Now" became a concert staple for LaBelle following the album's release. LaBelle's last contractual album with Philadelphia International, it was also her last album under a CBS-recorded label after an 11-year association. In addition, it was also the last PIR album to be distributed under the original deal with CBS Records before the label switched distribution to Manhattan Records.

Track listing

Personnel 

 Patti LaBelle – lead and harmony vocals, backing vocals (6)
 Cecil Du Valle – keyboards (1), synthesizers (1)
 Leon Huff – keyboards (1)
 Reggie Griffin – synthesizers (1, 2, 4), guitar (1), drum programming (2, 4), arrangements (2, 4), Minimoog (4), keyboards (4), bass (4)
 James Sigler – keyboards (2), synthesizers (2, 4), arrangements (2, 4, 5)
 William Jolly – keyboards (3), synthesizers (3), backing vocals (3), arrangements (3)
 Joel Bryant – acoustic piano (3)
 Lenny Pakula – organ (3)
 Bunny Sigler – keyboards (4)
 James Budd Ellison – acoustic piano (5), keyboards (8), arrangements (8), musical director (8), orchestra conductor (8)
 Philip Woo – acoustic piano (5), keyboards (8), synthesizers (8)
 Dexter Wansel – keyboards (6), arrangements (6)
 Joseph Jefferson – keyboards (7), arrangements (7)
 Herb Smith – guitar (1, 5, 6, 8), backing vocals (6, 8)
 Cecil Womack – guitar (1, 3), arrangements (1, 3)
 Dennis Harris – guitar (2, 4, 7)
 Jimmy Williams – bass (1-3, 5, 7)
 Steve Green – bass (6)
 Darryl Jones – bass (8)
 Quinton Joseph – drums (1-3)
 John Ingram – drums (5, 8), backing vocals (8)
 Charles Collins – drums (7)
 Clifford "Pete" Rudd – drums (6)
 Miguel Fuentes – percussion (6)
 Don Renaldo – horns and strings (2-4, 6)
 Sam Peake – saxophone (7), sax solo (8)
 Andrea Jackson – backing vocals (3)
 Donna Natson – backing vocals (3)
 Veronica Underwood – backing vocals (3)
 Cynthia Biggs – backing vocals (6)
 Terri Wells – backing vocals (6)
 Edward Batts – backing vocals (8)

Production 
 Executive Producers – Kenny Gamble and Leon Huff
 Engineers – Peter Humphreys, King Shameek, Arthur Stoppe and Joseph Tarsia.
 Assistant Engineers – Randy Abrams, Tom Caine, Marin Conaty, Scott MacMillan, Glenn McKee, Adam Silverman and Vince Warsavage.
 Tracks #1-7 recorded at Sigma Sound Studios (Philadelphia, PA).
 Track 9 recorded live at Convention Hall (Washington, D.C.). Remote unit provided by Fanta Sound Studios (Nashville, TN).
 Art Direction – Stephen Byram
 Illustration – Diane Best

Charts

Album chart usages for Billboard200
Album chart usages for BillboardRandBHipHop

References

1985 albums
Patti LaBelle albums
Albums produced by Leon Huff
Albums produced by Kenneth Gamble
Albums recorded at Sigma Sound Studios
Philadelphia International Records albums